Xatman (also, Khatman) is a village in the Agsu Rayon of Azerbaijan.  The village forms part of the municipality of Dilman.

References 

Populated places in Agsu District